Ali Selim (born 1960/1961) is an American film and television director. Over the past fifteen years he has directed over 850 television commercials, five half-hour documentaries and several music videos.

Early life
Selim was born in Saint Paul, Minnesota, and is of Egyptian and German descent. His parents were Dr. Mohamed Ali Selim and wife Evelyn Niemeier. He has two siblings. His father died in 2015 at the age of 91, and was a professor of economics at the University of St. Thomas.

Career
His first project, a documentary celebrating the centennial of Saint Thomas Academy, won awards at several international film festivals. Selim formed his own production company (Departure Films) in 1989. He directed a number of award-winning television commercials, including a public service announcement for the YMCA which received a Gold Lion, advertising's most coveted award, from Cannes Advertising Film Festival in 1991. Later that year, Selim was hired by Giraldi/Suarez Productions.

In 1993 Selim wrote, produced and directed Yonnondio, a 15-minute music video in collaboration with Academy Award-winning composer Peter Buffett which was awarded the Silver Hugo from the Chicago International Film Festival and a CINE Golden. Selim was an honoree at the AICP Show, "The Art and Technique of the American Television Commercial," where his work was placed in the permanent collection of the Museum of Modern Art in New York City.

His script for the film Sweet Land, based on a short story by Will Weaver, was the only screenplay selected for the inaugural year of the Cyngus Emerging Filmmakers Institute. The film, which took him fifteen years to finance, was shot in 2005 around Chippewa County, Minnesota.  It starred Alan Cumming, Ned Beatty, Elizabeth Reaser, Alex Kingston and John Heard. The film was the recipient of the 2005 Audience Award for Best Narrative Feature Film at the 13th Annual Hamptons International Film Festival, the 2006 Florida Film Festival: Audience Award for Best Narrative Feature, and the 2007 Independent Spirit Awards: Best First Feature.

His narrative film Emperor of the Air (1996), based on Ethan Canin's story of the same name, was awarded the top prize at Worldfest and the D. L. Mayberry Award. Selim was placed on Advertising Weekly'''s list of the top 1% most sought-after directors in the United States.

In May 2021, Selim was hired to direct episodes of the upcoming series Secret Invasion'' for Disney+.

Personal life
Selim is married to Robin Engstrom, of Swedish descent. He lives in Portland, Oregon.

Filmography

Awards and nominations

References

External links

Living people
21st-century American male writers
21st-century American screenwriters
American male screenwriters
American television directors
American television writers
American male television writers
American people of Egyptian descent
American people of German descent
Artists from Saint Paul, Minnesota
Film directors from Minnesota
Screenwriters from Minnesota
University of St. Thomas (Minnesota) alumni
Writers from Saint Paul, Minnesota
Year of birth missing (living people)